Jules Jacques Veyrassat (12 April 1828, Paris – 2 July 1893, Paris) was a French painter and engraver; associated with the Barbizon school. Most of his works feature animals.

Biography 
He studied in Paris with Henri Lehmann and exhibited his first works at the Salon in 1848. It was, in fact, Frère and Charles-François Daubigny who encouraged him to take up that art.

Between 1866 and 1869, he was presented with several awards for his engravings. Later, he collaborated with the British art critic, Philip Gilbert Hamerton, on two of his books devoted to the topic:  Chapters on Animals (1874), with Karl Bodmer, and the third edition of Etching and Etchers (1880), which featured the works of many notable artists, such as James Abbott McNeill Whistler,  Jozef Israëls and Alphonse Legros. He also produced engravings for a series of albums published by Alfred Cadart.

He was named a Knight in the Legion of Honor in 1878.

He was also associated with the Barbizon school, two of whose members, Charles Jacque and Jean-François Millet, had an influence on his style. As a result, his landscapes all depict some aspect of life in rural France. It would appear that he never travelled to any other countries.

He died in Paris and was interred at the Cimetière du Père-Lachaise.

His works may be seen at museums throughout France, as well as at the Manchester Art Gallery, the Legion of Honor in San Francisco, the Clark Art Institute in Williamstown, Massachusetts and the Walters Art Museum in Baltimore.

Selected paintings

References

Further reading 
 P.G. Hamerton, Etching and Etchers, Macmillan, 1880. Reissued by Andesite Press, 2017 
 Daniel Baduel, Aude Bertrand, Christian Dauchel, l'École d'Écouen, une colonie de peintres au XIXe siècle. STIP, Domont, 2014

External links 

More works by Veyrassat @ ArtNet

19th-century French painters
French landscape painters
French genre painters
French engravers
Animal painters
Painters from Paris
1828 births
1893 deaths